This list of museums in Massachusetts is a list of museums, defined for this context as institutions (including nonprofit organizations, government entities, and private businesses) that collect and care for objects of cultural, artistic, scientific, or historical interest and make their collections or related exhibits available for public viewing. Museums that exist only in cyberspace (i.e., virtual museums) are not included. Also included are non-profit art and university art galleries.

Museums

Defunct museums
 American Textile History Museum in Lowell closed in June 2016.
 Connecticut Valley Historical Museum, Springfield, closed in 2009, building will house the Amazing World of Dr. Seuss Museum
 FDR Center Museum, Worcester 
 A Frugal Woman's Museum, New Bedford, about Hetty Green, no current information
 Hallmark Museum of Contemporary Photography, Turners Falls, closed in 2012, student work still on display at Hallmark Institute of Photography
 Hands-On Art Museum, Shirley 
 Higgins Armory Museum - closed in 2014, collection will be absorbed into Worcester Art Museum
 Hollywood House of Wax, Salem - no current information
 Indian Motorcycle Museum, Springfield,
 Kendall Whaling Museum, Sharon, closed in 2001 as a public museum, now archive and research center, collections now reside at New Bedford Whaling Museum
 National Plastics Center & Museum, Leominster, closed in 2008 
 New England Fire and History Museum, Brewster
 Old Colony & Fall River Railroad Museum, Fall River, closed in September 2016 after years of low attendance. All railcar exhibits moved to other museums or sold to railroads.
 Plymouth Wax Museum, Plymouth, Cape Cod Visitor information, 
 Santarella, Tyringham, also formerly known as Henry Kitson Museum and Sculpture Gardens, no longer operates as a museum or gallery
 Porter Thermometer Museum, Onset, reported closed in 2012, photos
 Revolving Museum, Lowell, closed in 2012 
 Thornton W. Burgess Museum, East Sandwich, closed in 2013
 Words & Pictures Museum in Northampton
 Yesteryear's Doll Museum, Sandwich

See also 
 List of museums in Boston, Massachusetts
Nature centers in Massachusetts

References

External links
Museums in Massachusetts
Mass Home: Museums
Massachusetts Office of Travel & Tourism
Visit Massachusetts" Museums & Galleries

Massachusetts

Museums
Museums